The 2019 African Wrestling Championships was held in Hammamet, Tunisia from 29 to 31 March 2019.

Medal table

Team ranking

Medal summary

Men's freestyle

Men's Greco-Roman

Women's freestyle

References 

African Wrestling Championships
Africa
International sports competitions hosted by Tunisia
African Wrestling Championships
African Wrestling Championships